Anti-Cancer Agents in Medicinal Chemistry is a peer-reviewed academic journal covering the disciplines of medicinal chemistry and drug design relating to chemotherapeutic agents in cancer. It is published by Bentham Science Publishers and the editor-in-chief is Simone Carradori ("G. d'Annunzio" University of Chieti-Pescara). The journal covers developments in "medicinal chemistry and rational drug design for the discovery of anti-cancer agents" and publishes original research reports and review papers.

It is related to the journal Current Medicinal Chemistry and was established in 2001 as Current Medicinal Chemistry – Anti-Cancer Agents. The journal obtained its present title in 2006.

Abstracting and indexing
The journal is abstracted and indexed in:

According to the Journal Citation Reports, the journal has a 2020 impact factor of 2.505.

References

External links

Medicinal chemistry journals
Publications established in 2001
Bentham Science Publishers academic journals
English-language journals